Musikfest is an American music festival that has been held annually since 1984 in Bethlehem, Pennsylvania in the Lehigh Valley region of eastern Pennsylvania. It is the nation's largest non-gated free music festival. The festival begins on the first Friday in August, though it has been preceded since 2015 with a Thursday preview night involving the premium stage and adjacent areas. The festival ends the second Sunday thereafter.

Each year, thousands of visitors and residents of Pennsylvania make the trip to Bethlehem to participate in a celebration that weaves through a Moravian community that dates back to 1741. Festival visitors are treated to hundreds of free shows with great genre variety over the course of the event. Each night, the festival's premium stage, Steel Stage (formerly known as RiverPlace and Kunstplatz) hosts a nationally known recording artist. These premium concerts, along with select shows at other stages, require paid tickets to gain admission.

Musikfest is rooted in the Bethlehem area's German roots, and most of the festival's venues use , the German word for place or square, at the end of their names. A popular place for eating and listening to music, for example, is the large "Festplatz", which includes 300 dining tables, and usually features a polka band each night. Beyond that, however, Musikfest's music, food, and other attractions represent a broad range of cultures.

Musikfest is presented by ArtsQuest, a nonprofit arts organization founded to celebrate arts and culture in the Lehigh Valley and beyond. Proceeds from the event benefit ArtsQuest ventures such as the Banana Factory community arts center in South Bethlehem, and other nonprofit groups throughout the region. Musikfest served as the inspiration for major plot elements of the music film, Killian & the Comeback Kids.

Musikfest 2022 
Musikfest 39 will take place from August 5 to the 15th, celebrating music and the arts within the community of Bethlehem, Pennsylvania .

Musikfest 2022 poster

Fine artist Bart Cooper came up with a detailed poster, incorporating hidden imagery within his colorful vision. Capturing a joyful image of a father with his daughter hoisted onto his shoulders at Musikfest, Cooper wanted to bring warmth to his painting as the two share the same experience from different perspectives.

2022 performers
 August 4, 2022 –  Boyz II Men
 August 5, 2022 –  Kip Moore
 August 6, 2022 –  Willie Nelson & Family
 August 7, 2022 - Poison
 August 8, 2022 – Counting Crows
 August 9, 2022 – Ziggy Marley
 August 10, 2022 – Disturbed
 August 11, 2022 – Kelsea Ballerini
 August 12, 2022 – Ja Rule &  Ashanti
 August 13, 2022 - Alabama
 August 14, 2022 - Olga  Tañón

Musikfest 2021 
After going virtual for 2020, Musikfest returned from August 5 to August 15 with another community celebration to mark its 38th year.

Poppies of Remembrance, Lanterns of Hope
Musikfest 2021 differentiated from previous years, honoring the lives lost to the COVID-19 pandemic through the symbol of the Poppy flower in all operations of the event. Poppies of Remembrance, Lanterns of Hope was created through partnership with New Bethany Ministries to give the community a way to honor those lost, affected and to highlight the first responders of the pandemic. Through the illumination of votive candles inside paper bags, attendees paid respect to the lives lost. Those performing and in attendance were asked to #pausethemusik to take a moment of silence, remembering those who passed.

Musikfest 2021 poster
The event poster was painted by fine artist Mandy Martin, drawing inspiration from the revival of Bethlehem through the years. Poppies serve as the focal point of the poster, to represent the growth of the city of Bethlehem and the fest. As the painting began Spring of 2020, Mandy's symbolism took on different meanings as the pandemic progressed.

Musikfest Preview Night
In preparation for the festivities, equipment and the fest grounds were examined before welcoming Darius Rucker on August 5 to mark the start of the festivities.

2021 performers
 August 5, 2021 – Darius Rucker
 August 6, 2021 – Phillip Phillips
 August 7, 2021 – Preservation Hall Jazz Band
 August 8, 2021 – Sam Hunt
 August 9, 2021 – Shinedown 
 August 10, 2021 – Jimmie Allen
 August 11, 2021 – Colin Hay Band
 August 12, 2021 – KT Tunstall
 August 13, 2021 – Zedd
 August 14, 2021 – The Wood Brothers

Musikfest 2020 

Impacted by the COVID-19 pandemic, 2020 Musikfest was substantially scaled back from its traditional schedule of several hundred shows over the 10-day festival to only five live shows (along with live streaming of these shows). The festival took place July 31 to August 9.

2020 performers
 July 31, 2020 – The Uptown Band
 August 1, 2020 – The BRUCE Show (a Bruce Springsteen cover band)
 August 7, 2020 – Craig Thatcher Band
 August 8, 2020 – Hector Rosado Orchestra
 August 9, 2020 –  Danielle Ponder and fireworks

Musikfest 2019

2019 marks the 36th year of the annual music festival, which ran from August 2 to 11.

Wind Creek Bethlehem Steel Stage at PNC Plaza
 August 1, 2019 – Earth, Wind & Fire
 August 2, 2019 – The Chainsmokers
 August 3, 2019 – Steve Miller Band with  Marty Stuart and his Fabulous Superlatives
 August 4, 2019 – Lady A
 August 5, 2019 – Weezer
 August 6, 2019 – Train and Goo Goo Dolls
 August 7, 2019 – Incubus
 August 8, 2019 – The Revivalists
 August 9, 2019 – Godsmack
 August 10, 2019 – Phillip Phillips
 August 11, 2019 – Brad Paisley

Musikfest 2018
2018 marks the 35th Anniversary of the annual festival, which ran from August 3 to 12.

A special "35th Anniversary" poster was created by Dan Mugrauer, tattoo artist and owner of Blood Moon Tattoo Syndicate in Ambler, PA. The artwork will also be used for the official festival mug and souvenirs, while being incorporated into other official festival merchandise and apparel throughout the year.

Musikfest Preview Night 
To celebrate its 35th Anniversary, a special preview night will be held the day before the festival officially begins.

Sands Steel Stage at PNC Plaza
 August 2, 2018 – Voodoo Threauxdown featuring  Trombone Shorty & Orleans Avenue, Galactic, Preservation Hall Jazz Band, New Breed Brass Band, Cyril Neville, and Walter "Wolfman" Washington

2018 performers

Sands Casino Steel Stage at PNC Plaza
 August 3, 2018 – Styx and Joan Jett & the Blackhearts
 August 4, 2018 –  Daughtry
 August 5, 2018 – Jim Gaffigan
 August 6, 2018 – Dierks Bentley with special guest  LANCO
 August 7, 2018 – Kesha
 August 8, 2018 – Gary Clark Jr.
 August 9, 2018 –  Grouplove
 August 10, 2018 – Brantley Gilbert
 August 11, 2018 – All Time Low and Dashboard Confessional
 August 12, 2018 – Jason Mraz with opening act Brett Dennen

Air Products Americaplatz
Harlan Tucker Band, Funky Dawgz Brass Band, The LA Hustle, Erin Kelly Band, Nash East, Adam Doleac, Walker McGuire, The Family Crest, Craig Thatcher Band

BB&T Jazz Cabaret Stage
Chelsea Reed, Bob Wagner Quartet, Gretchen And The Pickpockets, Hot Club of Philadelphia, Red Hot Ramblers, Wack Cheddar, The Jost Project, The Barrel House Brothers, Eric Mintel Quartet

Hotel Bethlehem Platz
Sweetbriar Rose, Ruth Wyand & The Tribe of One, Josh Ronen, Andrea Nardello, Zaire Acoustic Trio

PNC Series at Musikfest Cafe
The Bryan Tuk Complex, Cunningham & Associates, Philadelphia Funk Authority, PMEA District Band, Steelstacks HS All-Star Band, The Moondogs, The SuperNaturals, The Dull Blue Lights, Magnum, Tommy Zito, Craig Kastelnik and Friends with Bernard Purdie

Musikfest 2017
The 34th iteration of the annual music festival took place from August 4 to 13.

On Saturday, August 5, a special 5k run dubbed the 'Musikfest 5K' was held in downtown Bethlehem during the festival

Sands Steel Stage at PNC Plaza 
 August 4, 2017 – Santana
 August 5, 2017 – Chicago with opening act Devon Gilfillian
 August 6, 2017 – Father John Misty with special guest  San Fermin
 August 7, 2017 – Live
 August 8, 2017 – Aloe Blacc
 August 9, 2017 – Godsmack
 August 10, 2017 – Toby Keith
 August 11, 2017 – The Band Perry
 August 12, 2017 – Lee Brice and Justin Moore
 August 13, 2017 –  Jethro Tull

2016 performers
Musikfest 2016, the 33rd iteration of the annual music festival, will take place from August 5 to 14.

Sands Steel Stage at PNC Plaza 
 August 5, 2016 – X Ambassadors with special guests Rachel Platten and Jukebox the Ghost
 August 6, 2016 – Run-DMC
 August 7, 2016 – Dierks Bentley with opening act Tucker Beathard
 August 8, 2016 – A Tribute to Prince & David Bowie featuring Swift Technique and Band From Mars
 August 9, 2016 – Boston
 August 10, 2016 – Don Henley with opening act Drew Holcomb and the Neighbors
 August 11, 2016 – Bush and Chevelle
 August 12, 2016 – Sabrina Carpenter
 August 13, 2016 – Lady Antebellum with opening acts Lauren Jenkins and Post Monroe
 August 14, 2016 – The Avett Brothers with special guest Langhorne Slim

— Aretha Franklin was to perform on August 8, but due to unforeseen logistical issues, the concert was cancelled

2015 performers
Musikfest 2015, the 32nd iteration of the annual music festival, took place from August 7 to 16.

Sands Steel Stage at PNC Plaza 
 August 6, 2015 – Duran Duran (performing as part of a special "Musikfest Preview Night")
 August 7, 2015 – The Flaming Lips with opening acts Chappo and VoirVoir
 August 8, 2015 – Culture Club
 August 9, 2015 – O.A.R. with special guests Allen Stone and Brynn Eliott
 August 10, 2015 – Jerry Seinfeld August 11, 2015 – Reba McEntire with special guest Caroline Kole August 12, 2015 – ZZ Top with special guest The Craig Thatcher Trio August 13, 2015 – 3 Doors Down and Collective Soul with opening act Eighteenth Hour August 14, 2015 – Darius Rucker with special guest Cassadee Pope August 15, 2015 – Snoop Dogg with opening act Trouble City All-Stars August 16, 2015 – Alice in Chains2014 performers
Musikfest 2014 took place from August 1 to 10.

 Sands Steel Stage at PNC Plaza 
 August 1, 2014 – Craig Thatcher Band with special guests Mike Dugan and The joEs (ZZ Top canceled due to Dusty Hill having kidney stone surgery).
 August 2, 2014 – The All-American Rejects with opening act The Lawsuits August 3, 2014 – Jason Derulo with opening act Fly Panda August 4, 2014 – Sheryl Crow August 5, 2014 – The Moody Blues August 6, 2014 – Steely Dan August 7, 2014 – The Avett Brothers with special guest Sister Sparrow & the Dirty Birds August 8, 2014 – Alan Jackson August 9, 2014 – Weezer with opening act Public Access T.V. August 10, 2014 – Keith Urban with special guest Brett EldredgeLutron Electronics Chamber Series at Central Moravian Church's Old Chapel
Denis Azabagic, Fairfield Duo, Zig Zag Quartet, Grace Adele Spruiell, and City Winds Trio

National Penn Bank Jazz Cabaret Stage at the Frank Banko Alehouse Cinemas
Michael Dease, Heather Friedman, The Cook Trio, Barbara Martin & Vince Lewis, Two Cent Jazz Band, Hambone Relay, The Dan Wilkins Group, Nashaz, Blackbird Society Orchestra, The Barrel House Brothers, Hot Club of Philadelphia, Michelle Wiley Quartet, Hot Bijouxx, Brooke DiCaro, Blair Crimmins and the Hookers, Chickentown, Michael Gallant Trio, and Joe Wagner Trio

 Yuengling Summer Concert Series at Steel Stage at PNC Plaza 
In anticipation for this year's Musikfest, a summer series of concerts are scheduled leading up to this year's Musikfest, with some occurring after the festival has ended.
 May 21, 2014 – Modest Mouse June 23, 2014 – Tegan and Sara with special guest My Midnight Heart September 19, 2014 – Third Eye BlindThe Platzes and other stagesAetna Americaplatz: Carolyn Wonderland, Daniel Ellsworth & The Great Lakes, The Interlopers, Jesse Dee, Atlas Road Crew, Melodime, Sam Hunt, James Supra Blues Band, AJ Smith & The Apollo, Robin McKelle & The Flytones, Wild Child, Scythian, Kevin Gordon, Marla & The Juniper Street Band, Stone Flower, Jeffrey Broussard & The Creole Cowboys, Keystone: A Tribute to Jerry Garcia, Southern Hospitality, Friar's Point, Igor & The Red Elvises, JD McPherson, Aaron Tracy Band, Scott Bradlee's Postmodern Jukebox, Craig Thatcher Band, Mike Mettalia and the Midnight Shift, Todd Wolfe Band, and The Blues BrotherhoodWells Fargo Festplatz: Jolly Joe Timmer, The Sofa Kings, The Golden Tones, Bud Hundenski and the Corsairs, The Amish Outlaws, The Nerds, Philadelphia Funk Authority, Brian Kirk and the Jirks, John Stevens' Doubleshot, M80, Rubix Kube, The Exceptions, Joyous, The Soul Cruisers, Boogie Wonder Band, John Stanky and the Coalminers, Scott Marshall and Marshall's Highway, Crazy Hearts, The Main Street Cruisers, Desire, The Fabulous Greaseband, The Polskie Swingmasters, The Polka Brothers, The Aardvarks, The Blue Meanies perform The Kinks, The British Invasion Tribute, The Glimmer Twins, Strawberry Fields – The Ultimate Beatles Tribute Band, Walt Groller Orchestra, Alex Meixner Band, The Uptown Band Air Products Handwerkplatz: Polynesian Dance Productions and Cast in BronzeMartin Guitar Lyrikplatz: Lily MaePlaza Tropical: Blue Wave Theory, Briar Rabbit, Lines in the Sky, Arc and Stones, Grandpa Rage, The Romantic Era, Cedar Green, Bushmaster

Musikfest 2013
Musikfest 2013, which is once again presented by ArtsQuest, took place from August 2 to 11. The festival included hundreds of performances by bands, artists, comedians, artisans, and buskers. They performed on over 14 indoor and outdoor stages and venues throughout Bethlehem's historic 18th-century downtown, the Sands Casino SteelStacks Plaza, the Artsquest Center, the PNC Plaza and the Yuengling Musikfest Cafe. This year's festival was special in that it was the 30th anniversary of Musikfest, and as such, many special events and concerts were planned to commemorate this event. The final day of the festival was capped by an impressive fireworks display presented by Garden State Fireworks.

New to the festival was an event called the "Musikfest Color-Me-Rad 5K"; a 5K run with a twist, the runners  were pelted with paint bombs from onlookers, as well as dodging and throwing paint bombs at each other. Also new to the festival was the First Annual Musikfest Volunteer Photography Exhibition. The exhibition highlighted the talents of the dedicated volunteers who document Musikfest each year. The exhibition featured the work of Dave Happel, Keith Huylebroeck, Joseph Ledva, Jeff Levy, Greg Ludwig, Diane Richter, Bob Yurko, and Adrianne Zimmerman.

Other events included interactive dance performances, late night stand-up comedy acts, multilingual Catholic masses, Presbyterian worship services, Methodist Celebrations, musical acts booked and presented by marketing students from the Bethlehem Area School District, SOStenuto Music Outreach Program presented by the YOUniversity of Music & Arts, and various retailers, vendors, and sponsored kiosks with interactive events, wares for sale, and contests.

 Sands Steel Stage at PNC Plaza 
 August 2, 2013 – Carly Rae Jepsen with supporting acts DJ Cap Cee and Sandlot Heroes  August 3, 2013 – OneRepublic with supporting acts Mayer Hawthorne and Serena Ryder August 4, 2013 – Skillet with supporting acts Thousand Foot Krutch, Decyfer Down, and We As Human August 5, 2013 – Frampton's Guitar Circus featuring Peter Frampton, B.B. King, and Sonny Landreth with special guest Vinnie Moore August 6, 2013 – George Thorogood & The Destroyers with supporting act Southside Johnny and the Asbury Jukes August 7, 2013 – Styx and Foreigner August 8, 2013 – KC and the Sunshine Band with special guest The Family Stone August 9, 2013 – Darius Rucker with opening act Chase Rice August 10, 2013 – Kesha with supporting act Semi Precious Weapons August 11, 2013 – Avenged Sevenfold with supporting acts Mindset Evolution and  Fight or Flight Lutron Electronics Chamber Series at Central Moravian Church's Old Chapel 
Bethlehem Baroque, Andrea Wittchen, Kim and Reggie Harris, Linaria Ensemble, and Muriel Anderson

 Vesper Concert Series at Central Moravian Church 
Robin Spielberg, Abaca String Band, Charisse Baldoria, Southside Brass, and Quattro Due

 The Platzes and other stages 
Many of Musikfest's stages feature free entertainment and activities.

Aetna Americaplatz at Levitt Pavilion SteelStacks
CC Coletti, Eric Steckel, Friar's Point, Christine Ohlman, Craig Thatcher Band, Leftover Cuties, Sean Nowell, The Red Elvises, Todd Wolfe Band, The Royal Scam, Jamie McLean Band, Mike Scala, Station, Hadden Sayers, Holly Williams, Idol Kings, Duffy Kane, Ball in the House, Trespass, Rick Estrin & The Nightcats, The Hunts, Lights Out, Here Come the Mummies, Quiet Company, Sarah Ayers, Splintered Sunlight, Erick Macek, Jeff Thomas' All Volunteer Army, and The Blues Brotherhood.

Mutual of Omaha Banana Island
Musikfest's family venue – kids' rides, activities and arts & crafts, children's performers, outdoor venue, with covered and uncovered seating. Planned events this year include a Creativity Tent, Themed Arts & Crafts Sessions, a Musikfest-wide Treasure Hunt, and mural painting done by various children (and adults) as a tribute to the 30th anniversary of Musikfest.

Wells Fargo Festplatz on Main and Spring Streets
Sofa Kings, Lucky 7, Joe Stanky and The Cadets, Jimmy Sturr and His Orchestra, The Aardvarks, Fritz's Polka Band, The Nerds, Philadelphia Funk Authority, The Rob Stoneback Big Band, Jump City Jazz Orchestra, Beantown Swing Orchestra, Joe Weber, Brian Clayton, Crazy Hearts, Tommy Guns Band, Joyous, The Exceptions, Boogie Wonder Band, The Soul Cruisers, Main Street Cruisers, Desire, Emily's Toybox, Joe Kroboth, John Stevens' Doubleshot, HALA Dance Expo, Alex Torres Band, The Wholigans, The English Channel, The Blue Meanies, Strawberry Fields, Walt Groller Orchestra, Bud Hudenski and The Corsairs, and The Alex Meixner Band.

Air Products Handwerkplatz
Cast in Bronze

National Penn Bank Jazz Cabaret Stage at the Frank Banko Alehouse Cinemas
Mike Lorenz, Blackbird Society Orchestra, Two Cent Jazz Band, The Smoke Rings, The Uptown Underground, The Hot Club of Philadelphia, Kristi Lynn Quartet, Tony Gairo Trio, Alignment, Helix, Dan DeChellis Trio, Jessy Carolina and The Hot Mess, Pamela Webb, Frenchy and the Punk, Bumper Jacksons, Blair Crimmins and The Hookers, Frank Giasullo Quartet, Hot Bijouxx, and Ben Mauger's Vintage Jazz Band.Late Night Comedy at the Frank Banko Alehouse Cinemas:Mandudebro, James Hesky, The Associated Mess, and Randy TongeDowntown Bethlehem Association Liederplatz:Lou Franco, John Gorka, Lehigh Valley Folk Society, Acoustic Roadshow, Daisy Jug Band, Dala, Eric Steckel, Ameranouche, Little Buddy, Goodnight Texas, Tumbling Bones, The StereoFidelics, Wanamaker Lewis Band, James Supra Band, Dina Hall Band, The Mallett Brothers Band, Billy Bauer Band, Zen for Primates, The Guggenheim Grotto, Wooly and The Mammoth, The Abrams Brothers, Craig Thatcher, Nyke Van Wyk, This Way To The Egress, Star and Micey, Gangstagrass, The Dustbowl Revival, Dave Fry, The Whiskeyhickon Boys, The Steel Wheels, New Sweden, Trout Fishing in America, Caravan of Thieves, Best of Open Mic, Lucy Kaplansky, Eighteenth Hour, and The Wiyos.Martin Guitar Lyrikplatz at the Frank Banko Alehouse Cinemas:Tim Harakal, Scott Marshall, Twain Blue, Angela Sheik, Just So, Heather Friedman, The Honey Badgers, Gina Sicilia, Erin Kelly, Nalani & Sarina, John Fadem, SJ, Brosky and Meyer, Graham Alexander, Kenny Ferrier, Tall Tall Trees, Skyler, Chris Pickering, Tracy Walton, Jared Weintraub, Nyke Van Wyk, Annaliese Emerick, Ryan Tennis, Lily Mae, Shane Cooley, Angelo M, Lizanne Knot, Karen and Amy Jones, Rachel Marie, Our Griffins, Melissa VanFleet, McClain Sullivan, Louis DeFabrizio, Heidi Winzinger, Matt Wade, Dina Hall, Twin Ghost, Rodger Delany, Dani Mari, Madison Cano, George Dennehy, Kwesi Kankam, John Childers, Amanda Duncan, The Vulcans, Brittany Ann, and Reverend TJ McGlinchey.Downtown Bethlehem Association Main Street:John Beacher, Lovebettie, Emily Mure, Harkland, Post Junction, Marc Singley, Miracles of Modern Science, On the Water, Joshua P. James and the Paper Planes, Pearl and the Beard, MiZ, Hillbilly Shakespeare, The Late Ancients, The Whiskeyhickon Boys, Bong Hits for Jesus, Tavern Tan, Kagero, Blue Jersey Band, Cinder Conk, Echo & Drake, John the Conqueror, Bumper Jacksons, Elijah and the Moon, Giani Paci, Shivering Timbers, Crushed Out, The Almighty Terribles, The 4 Walls, The Wallace Brothers, and DJ Fusion.Street Performers on Main Street:Johnathan Burns, Wacky Chad, Crazy Boy Coy, Breakatronz, Jason Divad, and Arizona Jones.PNC Series at the Yuengling Musikfest Cafe:BC Combo, The Smoke Rings, The Fabulous Greaseband, Sweet Leda and Ron Holloway, Gas House Gorillas, Work Release, Nouveaux Honkies, Craig Kastelnik & Friends, Tommy Zito, Magnum, Eric Mintel Quartet, Bob Lanza Blues Band, The Folkadelics, Cunningham and Associates, The Abrams Brothers, The Slicked Up Nines, Philadelphia Funk Authority, Moonshine Society, Ball in the House, Lucky 7, Hoppin' John Orchestra, Fox Street Allstars, The Aardvarks, Caravan of Thieves, and The Brosky/Meyer Band.Plaza Tropical:Carlos Núñez, Wito Rodriguez Salsa Jazz Orchestra, Steve Pullara and His Cool Beans Band, Time Will Tell, Ground Up, Bonner Band, Daylight, HOLA Showcase, Rolie Polie Guacamole, Me & My Uncle, Stone Flower, The Large Flowerheads, Craig Thatcher Band, Kira Willey, Lehigh Valley Music Teacher's Association, School of Rock, Sofia Rei, Gilberto Velez y su Orquestra Son 9, We Kids Rock, Twin Rivers Music Ensemble, Performing Artist Learning Center, Sinclarity, La Capitana, Crobot, The Joanie Leeds Duo, William Allen HS Chorale, Saucon Valley Music, Sabroso Video Showcase, StarFish, The Coffin Daggers, Mango Men, The Beach Bumz, Jimmy and The Parrots, The Billy Kelly Show, The Lesson Center, Quiet Company, Cheers Elephant, Great White Caps, Erin Lee and Up Past Bedtime, The Ballroom Thieves, Fox Street Allstars, Dana Twigg, Mad Rapture, Fright Barker & Sons, Hector Rosado, Uncle Rock, Los Hacheros, HALA-SUYA, and Luisito Rosario Orchestra.TD Bank Community Stage on Air Products Town Square:Lunic, nHeather Friedman, Honey Badgers, Madame Freak and The Funky Fever, Kill the Broadcast, Brick+Mortar, The StereoFidelics, Trouble City Allstars, Taking Tomorrow, The Bigness, Dear Anna, Access Royale, Hurray for the Riff Raff, Julian Fulton and The Zombie Gospel, Butterjive, Trevor Exter, Travel Songs, Spokey Speaky, and Doug Hawk Proposition.DANCENOW at the TD Bank Community Stage on Air Products Town Square:Sidra Bell Dance New York and Take DANCE by Phyllis McCabePennsylvania Lottery Volksplatz at Johnston Park:Vagabond Opera, UUU, O'Grady Quinlan Academy of Irish Dance, Dala, Ocean Celtic, M.A.K.U. Soundsystem, The Red Elvises, Irish Stars Parker School of Dance, Burning Bridget Cleary, Andy Shaw Band, PhillyBloco, Southern Culture on the Skids, Common Bond, Monarch Dance Company, Eco del Sur, Yahn Arkestra, Amish Outlaws, Marla & Juniper Street Band, Allegro Dance Company, SoulRagga, Djembe Jam, The Mickey Fins, Start Making Sense, Zaire, Sharon Plessl School of Dance, Roger Latzgo – Reflections in the Wine Dark Sea, Red Sea Pedestrians, Star and Micey, Gangstagrass, Buckwheat Zydeco, Good Time Charlie, Blue Ribbon Cloggers, African Benga Stars, Black Masala, Mama Jama, Moondog Medicine Show, Ball in the House, The Steel Wheels, Blackwater, Enter the Haggis, Lehigh Valley Cloggers, Trout Fishing in America, The Hunts, Daisy Jug Band, Alo Brasil, Los Straitjackets, Art and Rhythm of Dance with Tahya, Zap and The Naturals, Sylvana Joyce and The Moment, The Large Flowerheads, and Call Your Mama.

2012 Performers
Musikfest 2012, which is once again presented by ArtsQuest, will take place from August 3 to 12. The festival will include hundreds of musical performances on 16 indoor and outdoor stages throughout Bethlehem's historic 18th-century downtown, the Sands Casino SteelStacks Center, the PNC Plaza and the Yuengling Musikfest Cafe. In addition, the event will showcase delicious foods and treats, arts and crafts, and beverages by countless vendors. There are also a large variety of children's activities, multimedia tents, interactive activities and an impressive fireworks display on the final night of the festival.

 Sands Steel Stage at PNC Plaza 
 August 3, 2012 – Young the Giant with special guests Portugal. The Man and White Rabbits August 4, 2012 – Sublime with Rome with special guests Catch 22 and Matt Embree August 5, 2012 – MGMT with opening act Atlas Sound August 6, 2012 – Huey Lewis and the News and Joe Cocker August 7, 2012 – Goo Goo Dolls with opening act George Dennehy August 8, 2012 – The Dukes of September Rhythm Revue featuring Donald Fagen, Michael McDonald, and Boz Scaggs August 9, 2012 – Jane's Addiction with opening act Band of Skulls August 10, 2012 – Sheryl Crow with opening act Brandy Clark August 11, 2012 – Daughtry with opening acts Mike Sanchez, Betawolf, and Mike Rucco August 12, 2012 – Boston PNC Series at the Musikfest Cafe, presented by Yuengling 
 August 3, 2012 – Christine Havrilla & Gypsy Fuzz, The Slicked Up Nines, Glen Tickle and Jim Tews
 August 4, 2012 – Call Your Mama, Forward Motion, Tyler Rothrock and Tommy Pope
 August 5, 2012 – Friar's Point, Shelly Clark & Friends
 August 6, 2012 – Alastair Moock, Tommy Zito
 August 7, 2012 – Eric Mintel Quartet, Craig Kastelnick & Friends
 August 8, 2012 – Sarah Ayers Band, Robbi K and The New York All-Stars
 August 9, 2012 – Valerie Vigoda, Dueling Pianos
 August 10, 2012 – Avi Wisnia, The Large Flowerheads, Steve Bost and Pat House
 August 11, 2012 – Sarah King and The Smoke Rings, Mike Dugan & The Blues Mission, Tyler Rothrock and Ryan Hill
 August 12, 2012 – The Difference, Lucky 7

 The Platzes and other stages 
14 of Musikfest's stages, including the PNC Series at Musikfest Cafe,  present free music, arts, and entertainment for all ages.TD Bank Community Stage on Air Products Town Square: Butterjive, Doug Hawk Proposition, The Pine Hollows, The StereoFidelics, Trouble City All-Stars, Running Late, The 4 Walls, Revolution I Love you, Scott Pine and the Conifers, MiZ, Andrew Portz Band, Tavern Tan, Kill the Broadcast, Boom Chick, Four the Day, Dan Mills, The Young Wolverines, Lunic, XVSK, They Were Only Satellites, Just Married, The Kalob Griffin Band, Sarah Donner, The Almighty Terribles, and the Great White CapsAetna Americaplatz at Levitt Pavilion SteelStacks: Musikfest 2012 Opening Ceremonies, Royal Southern Brotherhood, Sena Ehrnhardt, The Burrows, Forward Motion, The Blues Brotherhood, Draw the Line, Homemade Jamz, 2U, The Difference, B-Street, MarchFourth Marching Band, Tusk, The Killdares, Live Wire, The Chris Beard Band, Chris Watson Band, The Aardvarks, Eric Steckel, and the Craig Thatcher BandMartin Guitar Lyrikplatz at Frank Banko Alehouse Cinemas: Brittany Ann, Mike Krisukas and Zen for Primates, Paulie Knakk, Blue Jean, Freak Owls, Michael Natrin, Connie Edinger and Tom Marchak, Gina Sicilia, Lucy Stone, Maggie Spike, Heidi Winzinger, Brosky 'n Meyer, Tim Butler, Kwesi Kankam, Connor McInerney, Mike and Ashley Duo, Yancarlos Sanchez, Perry Costello, Emily Mure, Paula Scott Duo, Mree, Dallas Vietty, Lizanno Knott, Ben Falandays, Kenny Ferrier, Jessica Smucker, Sarah Ayers, Carlos Barata, Katie Kelly, The Beautiful Distortion, Mule Dixon, Melissa VanFleet, Alex Radus, John Beacher, Hannah and Maggie, The Color Sound, Billy Bauer, Jon Fadem, AJ Silverberg, Shane Cooley, Larry Murante, XVSK, Just Married, Casey Cattie, Sarah Deardorff, Anthony D'Amato, Joe Ike, and Kwesi KankamKNBT Jazz Cabaret Stage at Frank Banko Alehouse Cinemas: Ben Mauger's Vintage Jazz Band, Kristi Lynn Quartet, Caravan of Thieves, Fusion Jazz Trio, Dan DeChellis Trio, Mike Lorenz Quartet, Dan Wilkins Quintet, The Tribute, Tony Gairo Hot Three, Andrea Carlson Trio, Gas House Gorillas, Andrew Pereira Quartet, Hot Bijouxx, Frank DiBussolo Trio, The Hoppin' John Orchestra, Displaced Peoples, Alex Levin Jazz Trio, Sarah King and The Smoke Rings, and Hot Club PhillyPeeps & Company Banana Island: We Kids Rock, The Cat's Pajamas, Steve Pullara's Cool Beans Band, Dave Fry, Erin Lee, Starfish, Alastair Moock, The Uncle Devin Show, Hector Rosado Drum Workshop, Nina Music, Meg's Melodies, Miss Maggie Sings, Fuzzy Lollipop, 2+1 Math Rocks!, Kira Willey, Uncle Rock, Rolie Polie Guacamole, Robbi K, Stacey Peasley Band, Baze and Silly Friends, Miss Amy & Her Big Kids Band, The Fuzzy Lemons, and The Deedle Deedle DeesChamber Series: Eliot String Quartet, James Nyoraku Schlefer and Nora Nohraku Suggs/The Bamboo 2, How Fair A Sound, The Dolce Ensemble, and Madeline Rose LinkWells Fargo Festplatz: Jolly Joe Timmer, Lucky 7, Henry & The Versa Js, Jimmy Sturr Orchestra, Frank Viele and the Manhattan Project, Eddie Forman Orchestra, Polka Country Musicians, Philadelphia Funk Authority, Joe Weber Band, Lenny Gomulka and Chicago Push, The Uptown Band featuring Erich Cawalla and Jenifer Kinder, Copper Box, Mike Surratt & The Continentals, UUU, Westallgaier, The Jumpers Orchestra, The Fabulous Greaseband, John Stevens Doubleshot, The Adlers, John Stanky and the Coalminers, Funky Fontana, Joseph Kroboth Band, Bud Hundeski & The Corsairs, HALA Espectacular, La Excelencia, Walt Groller Orchestra, Rob Stonebeck Band, and Alex Meixner BandHandwerkplatz: Cast in BronzeDowntown Bethlehem Association Liederplatz: Eric Mintel Quartet, Zen for Primates, Acoustic Roadshow, Roosevelt Dime, Spuyten Duyvil, Miss Tess & The Talkbacks, Lehigh Valley Folk Music Society, Daisy Jug Band, Dina Hall and The Backbeat, Chandler Travis Philharmonic, [Moonshine Society], 3AM (Three Acoustic Musicians—Plus 1), Cunningham and Associates, Bovine Social Club, New Found Road, Tumbling Bones, Billy Bauer Band, BC Combo, The Rosie Burgess Trio, Craig Thatcher and Nyke Van Wyk, Donovan Roberts, The Bucks County Folk Song Society, Hillbilly Souls, Little Buddy, Eric Steckel, Dave Fry, Mike Cross, BOOM, Girls Guns & Glory, and Bob MaloneDowntown Bethlehem Association Main Street: Lindsay Benner, Wacky Chad, Tin Bird Choir, Among Criminals, Runa Pacha, Waitin' on a Train, Caravan of Thieves, Post Junction, Graveyard Lovers, Mama Corn, The Barn Swallows, Kagero, Blue Jersey Band, Hillbilly Shakespeare, The Juice Box, WhiskeyHickon Boys, Phantasmagoria, Double Dutch Empire, The Byways, The Dang-It Bobbys, Freak Owls, Quimby Mountain Band, On The Water, Independence Drive, The Abrams Brothers, The Rosie Burgess Trio, The Wallace Brothers, Gangstagrass, Joe Whyte, and Carter3Productions PresentsThe Morning Call Plaza Tropical: The StereoFidelics, Keys N Krates, En Sequencia, SUYA, Irka Mateo, BELEZA!, Hector Rosado y Su Orchestra, 3AM (Three Acoustic Musicians—Plus 1), The Large Flowerheads, Marrakesh Express, John Kadlecik Band, Experience Janis, Irish Stars Parker School of Dance, The Monarch Dance Company, Saucon Valley Music, Born Into Dance, HALA Presents, Lehigh Valley Community Music School, LVPA Music Teacher's Association, School of Rock, Carbon Leaf, Splintered Sunlight, Kendal Conrad, The Scarlet Furies, CB Radio, Pure Country Dancers, Scott Marshall & Marshall's Highway, Connor Christian & Southern Gothic, Caribbean Steel Rhythms, Great White Caps, The Defending Champions, Jimmy & The Parrots, Yellow Dubmarine, The Lesson Center, Mark DeRose and The Way Home, Delta Rae, The Spinto Band, Dave Goddess Group, The Verticolors, Wiretree, Sister Sparrow & the Dirty Birds, Off The Map, Sabroso Video Showcase, and Alex Torres BandPennsylvania Lottery Volksplatz: UNRB, Tartanic, O'Grady Quinlan Academy, The Mystical Arts of Tibet, Sharon Plessl School of Dance, Rumbafrica, The Red Elvises, Blue Ribbon Cloggers, Caribbean Steel Rhythms, PANA!, The Lou Franco Project, Please Please Me, Incendio, Junior Toots, Start Making Sense, Pavlov's Dawgs, Allegro Dance Company, Seamus Kennedy, MarchFourth Marching Band, Appalachian Fiddle & Bluegrass Association, Steppin' Razor, Djembe Jam with Moe Jerant, Joan Soriano Family Band, The Killdares, Valeria Vigoda, Alex Meixner Band, Philly Bloco, M.A.K.U. Soundsystem, William Allen High Chorale, Amarach, John Byrne Band, Hudost, Diego's Umbrella, Blind Lights, Lehigh Valley Cloggers, Daisy Jug Band, Burning Bridget Cleary, The Prodigals, The Fighting Jamesons, Bhakti, Art of Rhythm and Dance with Tahya and Grant Smith, Telesma, Antioquia, and MatutoVesper Concert Series at Moravian College: Satori, DuoSF, Abaca String Band, Choo Choo Hu, and Hickory Brass

2011 Performers
Musikfest 2011, which is once again presented by ArtsQuest, will take place from August 5 to 14. The festival will include some 500 musical performances on 14 indoor and outdoor stages throughout Bethlehem's historic, 18th-century downtown.  In addition, the event will showcase delicious food and desserts by more than 60 vendors, a variety of children's activities, visual arts and crafts and a closing-night fireworks display.

This year's theme is "The Song Remains..." and the artists and events will showcase this. The official website indicates that the event will be extra special since there are some exciting, new changes in store as they are planning to incorporate part of the festival into SteelStacks on the Bethlehem's SouthSide.

The 2011 iteration of the yearly festival will also feature new stages and venues as well as an expansion of the physical size of the festival, now extending several venues out to the SteelStacks Center and the newly built PNC Plaza and Yuengling Musikfest Cafe. These new stages and venues have been collectively grouped as a whole and are now officially being referred to as "South Side" venues.

 Sands Steel Stage at PNC Plaza 
 August 5, 2011 – Stone Temple Pilots with opening acts Jet Stream and Rose Hill Drive
 August 6, 2011 – Maroon 5 with opening act PJ Morton
 August 7, 2011 – Miranda Cosgrove with opening act Greyson Chance
 August 8, 2011 – Steve Miller Band
 August 9, 2011 – Alison Krauss & Union Station featuring Jerry Douglas with opening act Dawes
 August 10, 2011 – Steely Dan with supporting acts Sam Yahel, The Miles High Big Band, and The Embassy Brats
 August 11, 2011 – Straight No Chaser
 August 12, 2011 – Buckcherry and Fuel with Art of Dying
 August 13, 2011 – Nick Jonas & the Administration
 August 14, 2011 – Train with special guests Nikki Jean and The Damnwells

 PNC Performing Arts Series at the Yuengling Musikfest Cafe 
 August 5, 2011 – Needtobreathe
 August 6, 2011 – Ravi Coltrane
 August 7, 2011 – Al Di Meola
 August 8, 2011 – Black Joe Lewis & the Honeybears
 August 9, 2011 – 7 Walkers
 August 10, 2011 – Nikka Costa
 August 11, 2011 – John Oates
 August 12, 2011 – The Red Horse Project featuring Eliza Gilkyson, John Gorka, and Lucy Kaplansky
 August 13, 2011 – The Verve Pipe
 August 14, 2011 – Ed Kowalczyk

 The Platzes 
Eleven of Musikfest's 14 stages feature free concerts.Americaplatz at Levitt Pavilion SteelStacks: Entrain, Float Parade, Trampled Under Foot, Los Straitjackets, Bill Kirchen & Too Much Fun, Mingo Fishtrap, MarchFourth Marching Band, Philly Bloco, Trailer Park Troubadours, CC Coletti, Craig Thatcher Band, Love in Stockholm, Sarah Ayers Band, James Supra Band, Scott Marshall and Marshall's Highway, The Blues Brotherhood, Little Buddy, Friar's Point, Hogmaw, Don Cunningham & His Cabinet, Peripheral Vision, FortyGrand, and The DifferenceBanana Island: Steve Pullara & His Cool Beans Band, Erin Lee & The Up Past Bedtime Band, Uncle Rock, Miss Amy & Her Big Kids Band, Kira Willey, Yosi & The Superdads, Alex & the Kaleidoscope Band, Shelly Clark & Friends, The Cat's Pajamas, 2 + 1 = Math Rocks, Nina Music, Robbi K, We Kids Rock, BASD Guitar Camp,  Mingo Fishtrap, Mike Dugan & The Blues Mission, Chris Bergson Band, Craig Kastelnik, New Tricks, B.D. Lenz, Zen for Primates, Ben Rudnick & Friends, Mustard's Retreat, Bill Warfield Octet, Fusion Jazz Trio, Ten Foot Tall, Eric Mintel Quintet, Alastair Monk, Dan Wilkins Quartet, Lu Mitchell, Ricky Smith & The Crush, Roaring 20s Jazz Orchestra, Tommy Zito, Triple Play, and Synergy BrassFestplatz: Jimmy Sturr, Walt Groller Orchestra, Eddie Forman Orchestra, John Stanky & The Coalminers, Die Fehrenbacher, Lenny Gomulka & Chicago Push, J&J Quartet, The Adlers, Kickin' Polkas, John Stevens' Doubleshot, Polka Country Musicians, Henry & The Versa J's, Jolly Joe Timmer, Here Come the Mummies, The Fabulous Greaseband, Philadelphia Funk Authority, New York Funk Exchange, Sensational Soul Cruisers, Main Street Cruisers, Rob Stonebeck, Lucky 7, M-80, and Alex Meixner BandLiederplatz: Jimmy Thackery, Cabinet, Fishtank Ensemble, The Arrogant Worms, Vance Gilbert, Yarn, Eric Steckel, Alexis P. Suter Band, Mustard's Retreat, Jann Klose, RUNA, Amarach, Sweetback Sisters, The Headers, Dave Fry, Rosie Burgess Trio, Donovan Roberts, BC Combo, Parkington Sisters, Connie Edinger Trio, Dina Hall, The Hillbilly Souls, Joshua Popejoy, Barnaby Bright, Matt Zeiner, Lou Franco Project, Acoustic Roadshow, Synergy Brass, Lehigh Valley Folk Music Society, and Godfrey Daniels' Best of Open MicLyrikplatz: Jordan White, Jennie Arnau, Kagero, Quincy Mumford, Mike Dugan, Maura Jensen, Jon Fadem, BC Combo, Brosky 'N Meyer, Donovan Roberts, Brittany Ann, Dina Hall, Billy Bauer, Freak Owls, Lizanne Knott, Alastair Monk, Neptune's Car, Lu Mitchell, Robbi K, Shane Cooley, Mree/Marie, Brenda Kahn, Larry Muarante, Lehigh Valley Idol, and Philly Songwriter's Project with J.D. MaloneMain Street: Float Parade, Quincy Mumford, The Culprits, Tavern Tan, Gangstagrass, Freak Owls, The Abrams Brothers, Zaire, mamarazzi, Rosie Burgess Trio, Vintage Dixieland Jazz Band, Parkington Sisters, The Wallace Brothers, and Synergy BrassThe Morning Call Plaza Tropical: The Dirty Guv'nahs, Sandlot Heroes, Bronze Radio Return, Albert Cummings, Todd Wolfe, Groovitude, The Arrogant Worms, Great White Caps, MarchFourth Marching Band, Tyler Grady & Wailing Waters, Eric Steckel, Geoff Davin, Burning Bridget Cleary, Moonshine Society, Steve Brosky & His Lil' Big Band, Saleros, SUYA, Sabroso Video Showcase, AMLA, The Mango Men, Brian & The Coconuts, Jimmy & The Parrots, School of Rock, She Said Sunday, Lehigh Valley Charter High School for the Arts, Lehigh Valley Piano Teachers, and Born Into the ArtsPennsylvania Lottery Volksplatz: Gaelic Storm, Brother Joscephus & the Love Revival Revolution Orchestra, Igor & The Red Elvises, Los Straitjackets, Float Parade, MarchFourth Marching Band, Red Baraat, Diego's Umbrella, Fishtank Ensemble, Start Making Sense, Gagarin Brothers, Trailer Park Troubadours, Kagero, Rosie Burgess Trio, Zen For Primates, Barleyjuice, The Headers, Sweetback Sisters, Daisy Jug Band, Layali El Andalus, Lu Mitchell, Tieweb, The Abrams Brothers, The Alex Meixner Band, Jackie Tice Ensemble, Sharon Plessl Excel Dance, Blue Ribbon Cloggers, Allegro Dance Company, O'Grady Quinlan, and The Lehigh Valley CloggersVesper Concert Series: Robin Spielberg, Alasdair Fraser & Natalie Haas, Synergy Brass, The Altino Brothers, and The Mendelssohn Trio

2010 Performers

Musikfest 2010, presented by ArtsQuest, took place Aug. 6–15, 2010. The festival included some 500 musical performances on 14 indoor and outdoor stages throughout Bethlehem's historic, 18th-century downtown. In addition, the event showcased delicious food and desserts by more than 60 vendors, a variety of children's activities, visual arts and crafts and a closing-night fireworks display. The official theme of that year's festival was Transformation, and to show this a new stage was added to the festival known as the Transformation Series Stage, located at Moravian College.

 Sands RiverPlace Stage 
 August 6, 2010 – Counting Crows with Augustana
 August 7, 2010 – Norah Jones with Elvis Perkins
 August 8, 2010 – Martina McBride
 August 9, 2010 – Lynyrd Skynyrd
 August 10, 2010 – Heart
 August 11, 2010 – The Doobie Brothers
 August 12, 2010 – Styx and Blue Öyster Cult
 August 13, 2010 – Adam Lambert with Orianthi and Allison Iraheta
 August 14, 2010 – Selena Gomez & the Scene with JLS and Hot Chelle Rae
 August 15, 2010 – Sublime With Rome and special guests The Dirty Heads and The Movement

 Musikfest Performing Arts Series 
Dark Star Orchestra, and The Avett Brothers

 PNC Bank Candlelight Concert Series 
The Music of Simon & Garfunkel Performed by A.J. Swearingen & Jonathan Beedle, Joe Lovano & John Scofield Quartet,  Richie Havens, Cherish the Ladies, Dave Mason, and Suzy Bogguss

 Amped Up! 
Similar to Musikfest 2009's Mid-Atlantic Band Competition, Musikfest 2010 features a competition for various bands to compete for spots at Musikfest. This year's competition is going to be called "Amped Up!". Beginning in April 2010 and ending later that month, bands interested in competing are to enter on the festival's official website. 10 bands will be chosen out of the multitude that will enter. Of those 10, the top 3 with the most votes will earn a concert at Musikfest as well as a monetary prize.

 Amped Up! Finalists 

Blue Wave Theory, BoomBoxRepairKit, Chewsen, Downtown Harvest, Open Till Midnight, Panic Years, Revolution I Love You, The Atomic Square, The Hide and Seek Effect, and The Ugly Club
 Bold denotes that the band was one of the three winners of the contest.

 The Platzes 
Eleven of Musikfest's 14 stages, including the new Transformation stage, feature free concerts.Americaplatz: Trombone Shorty & Orleans Avenue, Rod Piazza & The Mighty Flyers, Chris Duarte, The Commander Cody Band, The Dirty Guv'nahs, Dwight, Ana Popović, Sarah Borges & The Broken Singles, Wailing Waters, Philadelphia Funk Authority, Grayson Capps & The Stumpknockers, Craig Thatcher Band, Eric Steckel, Westside Winders, The Headers, Mike Dugan and The Blues Mission, The Mike Montrey Band, Meeting in the Aisle – A Tribute to Radiohead, James Supra Blues Band, BC Combo, Start Making Sense – Talking Heads Tribute, The Blues Brotherhood, Friar's Point, She Said Sunday, Lou Franco Project, FortyGrand, The Difference, and Peripheral Vision.Fowler & Peña Banana Island: Mingo Fishtrap, Lipbone Redding & The Lipbone Orchestra, Missy Raines & The New Hip, Elvis Bossa Nova, Zen For Primates, Craig Kastelnik & Friends, Bill Warfield Octet, Shelly Clark & Friends, The Gas House Gorillas, Jenny Dee & The Deelinquents, Babatunde Lea, Eric Mintel Quintet, Dueling Pianos, Big Bang Boom, The Cat's Pajamas, boyintheshade, Dave Fry, Frank Gisaullo Quartet, Kira Willey, The Riffters, The Shalitas, Tommy Zito, Uproar of the 70's, Tony & The Tonics, Steve Pullara & His Cool Beans Band, Large Flowerheads, Butterjive, Dan DeChillis Trio, Fusion Jazz Trio, Lachi, Miss Amy & Her Big Kids Band, Yosi & The Superdads, Alex & The Kaleidoscope Band, Hot Peas 'N Butter, Baze & His Silly Friends, Key Wilde & Mr. Clarke, Starfish, Peanut Butter Jellyfish, B.D. Lenz, Uncle Rock, Ernie & Neal, Nina Music, and Guitar Students with BASD.Chamber Series: Satori, Carpe Diem String Quartet, Denis Azabagic, and Silver & Brass.SuperGuarantee Festplatz: George Gee Swing Orchestra, The Fabulous Greaseband, Mingo Fishtrap, Sensational Soul Cruisers, Rob Stonebeck Big Band, The Flamin' Caucasians, Spitze!, Jimmy Sturr & His Orchestra, Main Street Cruisers, Lucky 7, M-80, CrazyHeart, Kickin' Polkas, John Stevens' Doubleshot, Dennis Polisky & The Maestro's Men, The Adlers, O.L.B. Part Power, Polka Country Musicians, Walt Groller Orchestra, Henry & The Versa J's, Lenny Gomulka & The Coalminers, The Alex Meixner Band, Joe Weber, Joe Kroboth, Jolly Joe Timmer, Eddie Forman Orchestra, and Lindyhop Swing Dancers.Handwerkplatz: Cast in Bronze.Liederplatz: Hoots & Hellmouth, Christine Havrilla, Edie Carey, Pamela Means, The Arrogant Worms, The Guggenheim Grotto, Three Legged Fox, Sweetback Sisters, Eric Steckel, Cabinet, The Bruce Katz Band, Cathie Ryan, The Headers, Todd Wolfe, Tin Bird Choir, Two Man Gentleman Band, Billy Bauer Band, Donovan Roberts, Scott Marshall & Marshall's Highway, Mike Cross, The Rosie Burgess Trio, Lindsay Mac, Dina Hall, Acoustic Roadshow, The Best of Godfrey Daniels' Open Mic Show, The Lehigh Valley Folk Music Society, and The Bucks County Folk Song Society.Martin Guitar Lyrikplatz: Jennie Arnau, Lachi, Bud Buckley, Mishal Moore, Scott McKenna, Shoulders of Giants, Jacob Vanags, Brosky 'N Meyer, Anna Rose, BC Combo, John Conahan, Lizanne Knott, Ben Arthur (musician), Michael Berkowitz, Dave Fry, Grace McLean, Quincy Mumford, Mr. Chris, Marnee, Daryl Shawn, ilyAIMY, Shannon & Natalie, The Philly Songwriters Showcase, Slate Belt Idol, Wild Flower Cafe Showcase, Barnaby Bright, Sarah Donner, Annie Simoni, Tim Butler, Ashley Lennon Thomas, Brian Mackey, Andrew Portz, Maura Jensen, Olivier Nataf-NO, Chris Bruni, Pat Guadagno, Craig Bickhardt, Ellen Woloshin, Pete Hanks, and Carlos Barata.Main Street: Overlook, Oso, The Greatest Funeral Ever, Elvis Bossa Nova, My Cousin the Emperor, Andy Suzuki & The Method, Amplify This, The Great Unknown, The Almighty Terribles, Grey Sky Turn, Steve Brosky 'N Jimmy Meyer, Two Man Gentleman Band, Little Buddy, Mark Zaleski, Abrams Brothers, Fellswoop, Loretta Hagen, Kinobe & Soul Beat Africa, Banjo Dan and the Mid-nite Plowboys, Parkington Sisters, The Hillbilly Souls, Joe White, Marnee, The Rosie Burgess Trio, The Wallace Brothers, Wineskin, Hogmaw, Ben Mauger's Dixieland Jazz Band, The Syncopatin' Six, and Audio Dynamikz Presents Vibrations On Main.The Morning Call Plaza Tropical: LaExcelencia, The Clarks, Splintered Sunlight, Los Straitjackets, The Arrogant Worms, Celtic Cross, Munelly, Jimmy & The Parrots, Papote Jimenez & Lower East Salsa, Luisto Rosario & Orquestra, Willie Colón, Santa Mamba, The Big Dirty, The Insidious Rays, Orchestra Herencia de Sonoros, CHEMBO and Grupo CHAWORD, Karen Rodriguez Latin Jazz Ensemble, ReggaeInfinity, David Cedeno & His Orchestra, Tieweb, Los Pocos Locos, The Hooligans, Davey & The Waverunners, Inner Visions, Freddie Long Band, Pete Francis, The B-Attitudes, b9 Fate, Five Mile Fall, The Mango Men, Ricky Smith & The Crush, School of Rock – Bank Street Band, Sabroso Video Showcase, Traditions of Hanover, Sumer Bleu's Violin Studio, LV Community Music School, The Doug Hawk Proposition, AMLA, SUYA, HALA – Salseros 2010, Lehigh Valley Piano Teachers Association, The Lesson Center, Bethlehem Music Settlement, and Lehigh Valley Community Music School.Transformation Series: John Scofield & Joe Lovano, Babatunde Lea, Cherish the Ladies, The Philadelphia Handbell Ensemble, and Elaine & Susan Hoffman-Watts.Vesper Series: Philadelphia Handbell Ensemble, Georgia Guitar Quartet, Innovata, The Altino Brothers, and The Dali Quartet.Pennsylvania Lottery Volksplatz: Trombone Shorty & Orleans Avenue, Igor & The Red Elvises, Scythian, Los Straitjackets, Rosie Ledet & The Zydeco Playboys, Mama Jama, Enter The Haggis, Diego's Umbrella, Red Baraat, Brother Joscephus & The Love Revival Revolution Orchestra, Spiritual Rez, RubbieBucket, 2U – U2 Tribute, Zen for Primates, Sweetback Sisters, Seamus Kennedy, Philly Bloco, Barleyjuice, Daisy Jug Band, Kagero, River City Slim & The Zydeco Hogs, Malinky, Burning Bridget Cleary, Balla Kouyate & World Vision, The Fabulous Shpielkehs, Kinobe & Soul Beat Africa, Satabdi Express, Abrams Brothers, Alex Meixner, The Alex Meixner Band, Rosie Burgess Trio, Great White Caps, Blackwater, Steppin' Razor, Brown Penny, Limpopo International Band, Jamani Drummers, Barynya Balalaika Duo, O'Grady Quinlan Academy, Sharon Plessl School of Dance, Allegro Dance Studio, Monarch Dance Company, Blue Ribbon Cloggers, Lehigh Valley Cloggers, and The Irish Stars.

2009 Performers
 Sands RiverPlace Stage 
 Commodores
 The Wallflowers and Chris Isaak
 Yes with special guest Asia
 David Cook with Green River Ordinance
 Third Eye Blind with special guest Matt Nathanson
 The B-52's and Joan Jett & The Blackhearts
 Puddle of Mudd with supporting acts Trapt and Stasis
 Pat Benatar and Blondie with The Donnas
 George Thorogood & The Destroyers with special guest Jonny Lang
 Crosby, Stills & Nash

 Independence IT Performing Arts Series 
Ladysmith Black Mambazo, Gordon Lightfoot, and Rufus Wainright.

 PNC Bank Candlelight Concert Series 
Martin Sexton, Al Stewart, Leon Redbone, Dar Williams, The Broadway Boys, and Simone.

 Northampton Community College Mid-Atlantic Band Competition 
A first for 2009, Musikfest is holding a web-based competition for any band in the mid-Atlantic  region of the United States to win a gig at this year's Musikfest. Twenty bands are slated to be chosen by online voting, out of the estimated hundreds that will most likely enter the competition. Of those twenty, 4 will be chosen after competitions between the bands, and those 4 bands will get performances at Musikfest 2009, as well as monetary prizes. Of those 4 bands, one will have their performance filmed and be guaranteed a booking at Musikfest 2010.

Entrance for the bands has since ended and the voting process will begin soon.

Northampton Community College Mid-Atlantic Band Competition Winners
The following 4 bands have been chosen out of the original Top 10 and have won the Mid-Atlantic Band Competition.

Dephonic, Jaded Son, Parkwright, and Reilly.
 The Gary Bonnett Band had originally been one of the four finalists, but had to cancel their performance for personal reasons. The band Reilly has since been given the honor of becoming one of the finalists.

 The Platze 
Eleven of Musikfest's 14 stages, located at platze (places) throughout the festival area, feature free concerts.Americaplatz: Sarah Ayers Band, The Craig Thatcher Band, HER & King's Country, Cooper Boone, Antsy McClain & The Trailer Park Troubadors, Eric Steckel, Larry Holmes & Marmalade, Rosie Flores, Peripheral Vision, Frog Holler, Dr. Dog, Deb Callahan Band, BC & Company, Ronnie Baker Brooks, Don Cunningham and His Cabinet, Steve Brosky & His Big Lil' Band, Stars of Bethlehem, Friar's Point, Todd Wolfe, Davy Knowles & Back Door Slam, The Doughboys, The Difference, Marcia Ball, Mike Dugan & The Blues Mission, Grayson Capps & The Stumpknockers, John Lee Hooker Junior, Scott Marshall & Marshall's Highway, Guitardogs, and The Philadelphia Funk Authority.Fowler & Peña Banana Island: The Trophy Husbands, The Uptown Band, Steve Pullara, Thaddeus Rex, The McKrells, Alison Brown Quartet, David Fry, The Dirty Sock Funtime Band, Nancy Coletti, Magnum, Trombosis, Ray Owen, The Cat's Pajamas, Tommy Zito, The Large Flowerheads, Kira Willey, BASD Guitar Camp, Fusion Jazz Trio, Big City Music Band, Project, Baze & His Silly Friends, Hot Peas 'N Butter, Women's Blues Alliance, Mingo Fishtrap, Two-of-a-Kind, Big Bang Boom, Shelly Clark, Craig Kastelnik, Miss Amy & Her Big Kids Band, BoyintheShade, Dan DeChellis Trio, Dueling Pianos, Suzi Shelton, Princess Katie & Racer Steve, Brad Litwin, John Németh, Missy Raines & The New Hip, Uncle Rock, Yosi & The Superdads, Marlene Gilley Swingtet, and Lucy Bonilla.Chamber Series: City Winds Trio, The Mascaro-Newman Duo, Innovata, Gabriel Chamber Ensemble, and The Sybarite Five.Evolution Music Series: Latin Fiesta: The Evolution of Latin Music, David Leonhardt: The Evolution of Jazz, Brad Litwin: The Evolution of Blues, Barry Hannigan: The Evolution of the Piano, and Dave Fry – Rock Roots: The Evolution of Rock 'n' Roll.The Morning Call Festplatz: Jolly Joe Timmer, Lenny Gomulka & The Chicago Push, Dennis Polisky & The Maestro's Men, Jump City Jazz, Walt Groller Orchestra, Jimmy Sturr & His Orchestra, Main Street Cruisers, Joe Weber, Polka Family Band, Crazy Heart, Joe Lastovica & The Polka Punch, Jon Stevens' Doubleshot, The Sensational Soul Cruisers, Die Fahrenbacher, The Slicked Up 9's, City Rhythm Orchestra, The Polka Quads, The Fabulous Greaseband, Josef Kroboth, The Steve Meisner Band, Lucky 7, Henry & The Versa J's, UUU, The Flamin' Caucasians, The Adlers, Brave Combo, and Alex Meixner & Bubba Hernandez.Handwerkplatz: Cast in BronzeLiederplatz: Scott Paul, Donovan-Roberts, Zen For Primates,  Lili Añel, The Headers, The Dan May Band, Webb Wilder & The Beatnicks, Eric Steckel, Lehigh Valley Folk Music Society, Catie Curtis, Digney Fignus, Antsy McClain & The Trailer Park Troubadours, Andrew Portz, Justin Solonyka, Emerald City, Burning Bridget Cleary, The Tartan Terrors, Seamus Kennedy, Acoustic Roadshow, Project, Lovell sisters, Natural Breakdown, Jack Murray, Paul Rishell and Annie Raines, Godfrey Daniels, Hoots & Hellmouth, The Chandler Travis Philharmonic, Chris Smither, Philadelphia Songwriters, David Jacobs-Strain, The Youngers, Carrie Rodriguez, Oakhurst, Matt Watroba, Andy Cohen, Robin Greenstein, Peter Siegel, Annie Hills with Jay Ansill & Strings, Bob Carlin & Cheick Hamala Diabaté, Beaucoup Blue, Radio Free Earth, Women in Docs, The Duhks, The Arrogant Worms, Lisa Bodnar Band, Fellswoop, Girls, Guns & Glory, and Chuck Mead.Martin Guitar Lyrikplatz: Jennie Arnau, Lachi, Bud Buckley, Mishal Moore, Scott McKenna, Shoulders of Giants, Jacob Vanags, Brosky 'N Meyer, Anna Rose, BC Combo, John Conahan, Lizanne Knott, Ben Arthur, Michael Berkowitz, Dave Fry, Grace McLean, Quincy Mumford, Mr. Chris, Marnee, Daryl Shawn, ilyAIMY, Shannon & Natalie, The Philly Songwriters Showcase, Slate Belt Idol, Wild Flower Cafe Showcase, Barnaby Bright, Sarah Donner, Annie Simoni, Tim Butler, Ashley Lennon Thomas, Brian Mackey, Andrew Portz, Maura Jensen, Olivier Nataf-NO, Chris Bruni, Pat Guadagno, Craig Bickhardt, Ellen Woloshin, Pete Hanks, Yancarlos Sanchez, and Carlos Barata.Plaza Tropical: Ogans, Luisito Rosario & Orquetra, PhillyBloco, Latin Fiesta, Chino Nunez, AMLA Showcase, The Young Werewolves, The Coffin Daggers, Los Straitjackets, HALA Solseros 2009, Lehigh Valley Pennsylvania Music Teachers Association, Bethlehem Music Settlement, Go Trio, Sandlot Heroes, Dephonic, Jaded Son, Paul Green School of Rock Music, Community Music School, Irish Stars Parker School of Irish Dance, Monarch Dance Company, Talking Heads Tribute: Start Making Sense, Parkwright, Reilly, The Oasis Band, SWiM, Beyond Barriers, Butterjive, KEF, Splintered Sunlight, The Mango Men, Parrot Beach, The Toga Party Band, Jimmy & The Parrots, Lehigh Valley Charter High School for the Performing Arts, The Lesson Center, 3D Ritmo de Vida, Santa Mamba, Sergio Rivera & Friends Salsa, SUYA, Frankie Morales & the Mambo of the Times Orchestra, Pablo Mayor & Folklore Urbano, Sabroso Video Showcase, and Hector Rosado y su Orchestra Aché.Pennsylvania Lottery Volksplatz: George Hrab & the Geologic Orchestra, Brother, Auerhahn Schuhplattler Verein, Li'l Anne & Hot Cayenne, Trouble City All Stars, Trombone Shorty & Orleans Avenue, Blue Ribbon Cloggers, C'est Si Bon, Jamnazi Africa Band, Daisy Jug Band, The Tartan Terrors, Alô Brasil, Seamus Kennedy, Digney Fignus, Lovell sisters, Zydeco-A-Go-Go, Los Straitjackets, Allegro Dance Company, The Jamani Drummers, Bearfoot, Salsa Celtica, Mingo Fishtrap, Mama Jama, Music From China, Blackwater, Oakhurst, Scythian, O'Grady-Quinlan Academy, Barynya Russian Balalaika, Duo The Doc Marshalls, Spiritual Rez, Tempest, Brownpenny, The Martin Family Band, Super Haki Haki with Dola Kabarry, West Philadelphia Orchestra, The Red Elvises, Lehigh Valley Cloggers, I Paesani, The Afromotive, Witches in Bikinis, Sharon Plessl/Excel Dance Company, Catfish and The Crawdaddies, and The Blues Brotherhood.Vesper Series: The Colorado Quartet, Bay Street Brassworks, The Ravel Trio, All4One Piano Duo, and Barry Hannigan.

2008 Performers

 Straub Dodge Chrysler Jeep RiverPlace Stage 
 Avril Lavigne
 Live and Collective Soul
 Kool & the Gang
 Boston
 Poison
 Earth, Wind & Fire
 Jethro Tull
 Stone Temple Pilots and Black Rebel Motorcycle Club
 Lonestar and Diamond Rio
 John Fogerty

 MRK Hostwindow Performing Arts Series 
Lez Zeppelin, Dennis DeYoung, .38 Special, Phil Vassar, Citizen Cope, and Rosanne Cash

 PNC Bank Candlelight Concert Series 
John Gorka, Eileen Ivers, Over the Rhine, Edwin McCain, The Dixie Hummingbirds, and Christian McBride.

 The Platze Americaplatz:Sarah Ayers, Tommy Castro, Collins Brothers Band, Mother Truckers, Matt Jenkins, The Rob Stoneback Big Band, Antsy McClain & The Trailer Park Troubadours, West Side Winders, The Mayor & His Cabinet, The Craig Thatcher Band, Roomful of Blues, Peripheral Vision, Deb Callahan, Lil' Ed & The Blue Imperials, Leslie, Webb Wilder, Matt Zeiner, The Last Waltz Ensemble, Ryan Shaw, Eric Steckel, Todd Wolfe, Blue Wild Gypsy, and The Sensational Soul Cruisers.Banana Island:Joe Baione, Zen for Primates, Steve Pullara & The Cool Beans Band, Yosi & The Superdads, BC & The Blues Crew, Geoff Achinson & The Souldiggers, Thaddeus Rex, The Cat's Pajamas, Dan DeChellis, Craig Kastelnik, Ray Owen, The Jimmies, Dave Fry, Tommy Zito, Triple Play, Uproar of 1968, Mister Ray, Moove & Groove, Lauren Musurneci & Joe Musurneci, Kind of Blue, Dueling Pianos, Starfish, David Joel, The Element, Big Jeff & His Mid-Sized Band, Miss Amy, Tim Marchetto, Lao Tizer, Mingo Fishtrap, and Marlene Giley.Festplatz:Eddie Forman, Jolly Joe Timmer, Dennis Polisky & The Maestro's Men, Big Tubba Mista, Jump City Jazz, Steve Meisner, Walt Groller, Jimmy Sturr, Josef Kroboth, Polka Family Band, The Farmer's Daughter, Crazy Heart, Lucky 7, Die Mariazeller, Joe Grikman, Lebanon Big Swing Band, City Rhythm Orchestra, Doubleshoot, Fabulous Greaseband, Adam Barthalt, Shama Lama, UUU, The Flamin' Caucasians, Joe Weber, The Adlers, Lyn Marie & The Boxhounds, and Alex Meixner.Main Street:Religion & Cash, Jackie Tice, Kane & Beatty, Straight Drive, Tavern Tan Band, Not Quite Sure, Beaucoup Blue, The Syncopatin' Six, Mad Sweet Pangs, Scott Marshall, Jackknife Betty, Mount Laurel Bluegrass Band, My Better Half, Russ Rentler, Erick Macek, Marc Silver, Tin Kettle, Jay Smar, Run Mountain, The Big Dirty, Doug Smith, Two Man Gentlemen Band, Wahoo Skiffle Crazies, and Quick Step John.Liederplatz:Women In Docs, Cadillac Sky, Straight Drive, Ernie Hawkins, Paul & Storm, Chestnut Brass Company, J.B. Kline, Frank Bey & The Swing City Blues Band, Alathea, Emerald City, Kennedy's Kitchen, Sligo Rags, The Lovell Sisters, Jason Spooner, Janis Ian, Toby Walker, Godfrey Daniels, The McKrells, Susan Werner, The Electric Farm, The Philadelphia Songwriters, Tommy Womack, The Doc Marshalls, The Section Quartet, Cathy & Marcy, Radio Free Earth, Dan May, The Daisy Jug Band, The DoughBoys, Jann Klose, Vanida Gai, Craig Bickhardt, Lizanne Knot, and Peter Karp.Lyrikplatz:Jerry Haines, Lester Hersch, Lisa Bodnar, Sara Cox, Gillian Grassie, Brian Thomas Jackson, Kendra Ross, Tim Miller, Arlon Bennett, Lili Anel, Steve Mahoney, Donovan Roberts, Tim Marchetto, Andrew Portz, David LaFleur, Skip Denenberg, Shawn Z., HelenMaria, Joey Mutis, Jeff Umbehauer, Christy Jefferson, Steve Brosky & Jimmy Meyer, Laura Warshauer, Ken Waldman, Eric Macek, Sarah Donner, George Hrab, Casey Desmond, Phoebe Henry, Ange & Ris, John Conahan, Susie Keynes, Jann Klose, Vanida Gail, and Alfred James.Plaza Tropical:3D Ritmo De Vida, Santa Mamba, D'La Kalle, Chino Nunez & Friends, Frankie Morales & The Mambo of the Time Band, AMLA, The Coffin Daggers, The Atomic Mosquitoes, Diamond Head, The Salseros, Beyond Barriers, SWiM, Cubana Tres, Butterjive, Project 222, Splintered Sunlight, The John Frizi Band, Jimmy & The Parrots, 1910 Fruitgum Company, Manuel Quintana, Larry Hoppen, Robbie Dupree, Mama Jama, Sabroso, and Luisito Rosario.Volksplatz:Sharon Plessel, Zydeco-A-Go-Go, Alex Meixner, Finn's Fury, Yo Mama's Big Fat Booty Band, Blue Ribbon Cloggers, Resonance Percussion, Terrance Simien, Barynaya Russian Balalaika Duo, The Lovell Sisters, Dixie Power, Entrain, Seamus Kennedy, O'Grady Quinlan School of Irish Dance, The Martin Family Band, Paul Cebar, Post Junction, Tempest, Flamenco Tabla, Ansambl Mastika, The Chicago Afro-Beat Project, Scythian, Kazka, The VooDudes, Red Elvises, Animus, River City Slim, Raposo, and The Blues Brotherhood.

2007 Performers

 Straub Dodge Chrysler Jeep RiverPlace Stage 
 The Black Crowes
 Ludacris with special guest Lil Mama
 B.B. King with special guest Al Green
 Meat Loaf
 The Moody Blues
 Patti LaBelle
 Deep Purple with supporting act John Kay & Steppenwolf
 Joe Walsh with special guest JD & The Straight Shot
 Big & Rich with supporting act Cowboy Troy
 Stone Sour with supporting act Sydonia

 MRK Hostwindow Performing Arts Series 
The Yellowjackets, Joan Osborne, Dark Star Orchestra, The Manhattan Transfer, The Yardbirds and Petula Clark.

 PNC Bank Candlelight Concert Series 
Amos Lee, Jonatha Brooke, Tom Rush, Kim Richey, Cornell Gunter's Coasters, and David Bromberg.

 Performances by 
Bang Camaro, Tea Leaf Green, Rod Piazza & the Mighty Flyers, Watermelon Slim & the Workers, Babatundae Lea, Stanton Moore, Entrain, Zydepunks, Yo Mama's Big Fat Booty Band, The Fabulous Greaseband, Jimmy Sturr & His Orchestra, Enter the Haggis, Scythian, Brother, Shafatullah Khan, Mingo Fishtrap, GrooveLily, The Arrogant Worms, GO!GO!7188 and literally hundreds more performers of countless different genres.

2006 Performers

 Straub Dodge Chrysler Jeep RiverPlace Stage 
 Alice in Chains
 Train
 LL Cool J with special guest Ne-Yo
 Trace Adkins with supporting act The Wreckers
 KC and the Sunshine Band with special guests Gloria Gaynor, Tavares, and  Sister Sledge
 Melissa Etheridge
 Styx and Kansas
 Kenny G
 Carrie Underwood
 Heart

2005 Performers

 Straub Dodge Chrysler Jeep RiverPlace Stage 
 Donna Summer
 Clay Aiken
 Seether with supporting acts Crossfade, Halestorm, and Dark New Day
 Jo Dee Messina
 The Beach Boys
 George Thorogood & The Destroyers
 REO Speedwagon
 Keith Urban
 Steve Miller Band
 George Clinton and Parliament-Funkadelic

2004 Performers

 Straub Dodge Chrysler Jeep RiverPlace Stage 
 Clay Aiken with opening act Heather Hillegas and Led Foot
 Huey Lewis and the News
 Peter Frampton with supporting act Nils Lofgren
 Chingy and Twista
 Alice Cooper with supporting act Runner and The Thermodynamics
 Crosby, Stills & Nash
 Radio Disney Showcase featuring Fefe Dobson, Aaron Carter, Baha Men, Gregory Raposo, The Beu Sisters, and Stevie Brock
 Lonestar with special guest Sara Evans
 Creedence Clearwater Revisited with special guest Eric Burdon & The Animals
 The Temptations with special guest Mary Wilson

 Fleet Bank Performing Art Series at Zoellner Arts Center 
Etta James with special guest The Roots Band, Avalon, Tony Orlando, Lucinda Williams, Delbert McClinton, and Chris Botti

 Vesper Series at the Central Moravian Church 
Todd and Cindy Bauchspies, Robin Spielberg, Innovata, Dean Shostak, Linda Kistler, and Michael Toth

 Chamber Series at the Moravian Old Chapel 
Silver & Brass Quartet, Jessica Suchy-Pilalis, Dean Shostak, Andrea Brachfeld, and The Pennsylvania Guitar Quintet

2003 Performers

Straub Dodge Chrysler Jeep RiverPlace Stage
 Kenny Wayne Shepherd
 Staind with supporting acts Static-X and Lo-Pro
 The B-52's
 O-Town
 Earth, Wind & Fire
 Steve Winwood
 The Beach Boys
 Martina McBride
 Jethro Tull
 Melissa Etheridge with special guest John Eddie.

2002 Performers

MetLife RiverPlace Stage
 The Guess Who and Blue Öyster Cult
 Kansas and Little River Band
 Lifehouse and Dishwalla
 Live
 Michael Bolton
 Peter, Paul and Mary
 Shaggy
 Hootie & the Blowfish
 Johnny Lang with special guests Craig Thatcher and Mike Dugan
 The Allentown Symphony Orchestra

Zoellner Arts Center Stage
Stephen Schwartz, Keiko Matsui, The Broadway Kids, Gerald Albright, Shawn Colvin, and Mickey Hart.

Moravian College Foy Hall Stage
Roger McGuinn, Annie Haslam, Providence, Beauties Witches & Britches, Indigenous, Beth Nielsen Chapman, Al Di Meola, and The Von Trapp Children.

2001 Performers
PPL RiverPlace Stage on Sand Island
 Elvis Crespo with special guest Fulanito
 Fuel (performed twice due to Sheryl Crow cancelling her show)
 The Neville Brothers
 Indigo Girls
 Chicago
 Montgomery Gentry
 Aaron Carter and The A*Teens
 O-Town
 Huey Lewis and the News

2000 Performers
PPL RiverPlace Stage on Sand Island
 Savage Garden with opening act Kina
 Wheatus
 Lynyrd Skynyrd with special guest Clay Davidson
 Robert Cray
 Bowzer's Rock & Roll Party featuring Bowzer, Gary U.S. Bonds, The Tokens, The Chiffons, The Tymes, and Len Barry
 Sugar Ray
 Duran Duran
 Foghat
 Boyz II Men
 Molly Hatchet
 Paul Rodgers

1999 Performers

Kunstplatz Stage
 Hootie & the Blowfish with special guest Train
 Tony Bennett
 Foreigner
 Joey McIntyre with special guests Jennifer Paige and C-Note
 Jonny Lang
 Kenny Rogers
 Branford Marsalis
 Mark Chesnutt
 The Fabulous Greaseband
 The Lettermen

1998 Performers

Kunstplatz Stage
 The Fabulous Greaseband
 Celia Cruz and José Alberto "El Canario"
 Savage Garden
 Ray Charles
 Indigo Girls
 Trace Adkins
 Wayne Newton
 The Village People
 David Sanborn
 Starship and Mickey Thomas

Americaplatz Stage
The Chicks, Pulse, Natraj

1997 Performers

Kunstplatz Stage
 KC and the Sunshine Band
 Tom Jones
 Patti LaBelle
 Little Richard
 Blessid Union of Souls
 Hall & Oates
 Buddy Guy and The Fabulous Thunderbirds
 Al Jarreau
 Tracy Byrd

1996 Performers

Kunstplatz Stage
 The Guess Who
 Béla Fleck and the Flecktones
 Creedence Clearwater Revisited
 Frankie Valli and The Four Seasons
 Diamond Rio
 A Night in New Orleans Featuring the Music of Al Hirt, Pete Fountain, and the Preservation Hall Jazz Band
 The Commodores
 All-4-One
 Vic Damone

1995 Performers

Kunstplatz Stage
 The Everly Brothers
 Yellowjackets
 The Neville Brothers
 River City Brass Band
 Kathy Mattea
 Three Dog Night
 Eddie Money
 Roberta Flack
 The Fabulous Greaseband
 Restless Heart

1994 Performers

Kunstplatz Stage
 The Lettermen
 George Benson
 Restless Heart
 Russ Freeman & The Rippingtons
 Dan Hill
 Peabo Bryson
 Ben E. King
 Jay Black
 The Manhattan Transfer

1993 Performers

Kunstplatz Stage
 Brian Hyland with special guests Jan and Dean
 The Fabulous Thunderbirds
 Grover Washington, Jr.
 Air Supply
 Al Martino
 1964 the Tribute
 Crystal Gayle
 Johnny Rivers
 Gordon Lightfoot

1992 Performers

Kunstplatz Stage
 The Kingston Trio
 Mary Wilson
 Maureen McGovern
 Trisha Yearwood
 Lou Rawls
 America
 REO Speedwagon
 Tommy James
 Neil Sedaka
 Captain & Tennille

Candlelight Concert Series
 Calliope
 The No Name Gospel Singers
 Lenny Pickett
 Lehigh Valley Chamber Orchestra directed by Donald Spieth
 Liz Story
 Cavani String Quartet
 Louisiana Repertory Jazz Ensemble
 Mozart on Fifth

1991 Performers

Kunstplatz Stage
 Los Lobos
 Blood, Sweat & Tears
 The 5th Dimension
 Eddie Rabbitt
 The Jimmy Dorsey Orchestra
 Queen Ida
 Stanley Jordan
 Little River Band
 Tommy Makem and Barley Bree

1990 Performers

Kunstplatz Stage
 Diane Schuur
 The Temptations
 Marie Osmond
 Peter Noone
 Spyro Gyra and Gamalon
 Three Dog Night
 Mitch Ryder
 Jay & the Techniques
 The Four Freshmen
 Kay Starr
 Buddy DeFranco
 The Woody Herman Orchestra
 Artie Shaw
 Mike Duagn
 BeauSoleil
 Thom Schuyler

1989 Performers

Kunstplatz Stage
 Allentown Band
 The Duprees
 The Lettermen
 The Sammy Kaye Orchestra directed by Roger Thorpe
 Livingston Taylor
 David Buskin and Robin Batteau, as "Buskin & Batteau"
 Flora Purim
 The Duke Ellington Orchestra directed by Mercer Ellington
 The Dan Seals Show with guest artist Edgar Schofield Baum
 The Clancy Brothers with special guest Robbie O'Connell and guest artist David Johns
 Johnny Rivers
 The Sun Rhythm Section
 Nancy Wilson
 Christopher Hollyday & His Quartet
 The Association

Asa Packer Concert Series at the Packer Memorial Chapel
 Lehigh Valley Chamber Orchestra conducted by Donald Spieth
 Pennsylvania Sinfonia Orchestra conducted by Allan Birney, featuring guest musician Robert Bonfiglio
 The Musikfest Chorus
 The Bach Choir of Bethlehem

Candlelight Concert Series at the Hotel Bethlehem
 The Washington Guitar Quintet featuring Charlie Byrd and Chuck Redd
 Adam Makowicz
 The Colorado String Quartet
 Free Flight
 Leon Bates
 Tom Chapin
 The Hi-Tops

Chamber Music at Moravian College
 Konrad Elser & Renee Morlock, Four Nations Ensemble, Moravian Trombine Choir, Anime featuring music performed by Robin Kani, Rebecca Brown, and Francis Rowell, Scott Jackson Riley and Mary Hurlbut, and Dana Muller and Gary Steigerwalt.

Vesper Concert Series at Moravian College
The Moravian College Collegium Musicum, The Bethlehem A Capella Singers, Concord Chamber Singers, The Philadelphia Brass Ensemble, and Barry Snyder.

Moravian Music Fest at Moravian College
Moravian College Choir

The PlatzesAmericaplatz: Alpha Legion Band, Boo Doo, Devonsquare, The Goschenhoppen Cornet Band, The Horseflies, David Roth, David Amram Jazz Quartet, Country Current from the United States Navy Band, Bill Miller, The Shady Groves Band, Robin and Linda Williams, Thom Schuyler, Frank Micael Orchestra, Richard Reiter Jazz Quintet, Reading Community Gospel Choir, Modern String Quartet, D.J. & The C.B. Pickers, The Limits, Bobby "Lips" Levine & His Dixieland All-Stars, Laurie Lewis & Grant Street, and Steamin' Jimmies & the Sugar Cone Horns.Familienplatz: Greater Lehigh Valley Youth Orchestra, DayBreak, Bob Norman, Allegra, A performance by the students of Suzuki Institute at Moravian Academy, Shanachians, Roger Latzgo, The Heartbeats, Beltane, Balloons the Clown, Gene Galligan, Saul Broudy & Friends, David Roth, Elaine Silver, Tom Espinola & Lorraine Duisit, Steamin' Jimmies & the Sugar Cone Horns, Guitar Students of Marvin Falcon, Jay Smar, Janci Brothers, Bill Miller, Juggernaut, Mainstreet Brass Quintet, Rod MacDonald, Last Call, United States Air Force Band, Cliff Wright, Moses Rascoe, Fred Warning & the Jazz Elite, Helicon, Seona McDowell, Vital Link, Pennsylvania Youth Theater, Jimmy Lawrence, The Holt Twins and Tony T, Daisy Jug Band, The Three Sillies performed by Touchstone Theater, Rockroots, and Critton Hollow.Festplatz: Mike Surratt & The Continentals of Washington D.C., Musikverein Feuerwehrkapelle Huttenheim, Pennsylvania Alpiners, The Joe Reichel Orchestra, Jolly Joe Timmer, Jimmy Soldridge & The Happy Yanks, Steve Huber & The Happy Austrians, Key-Notes Orchestra, Bob Danner's Little German Band, Jolly Joe & the Bavarians, and The Walt Groller Orchestra.Kinderplatz: Captain Juggle, Clarence the Clown, Melanie Wagner, Mark Reed & Sons, Pan's Fancy, The Mock Turtle Marionette Theater, Al Grout, Joseph Keppel, The Original Hurdy-Gurdy Man, Ray Owen, Jay Smar, Fantasia-Ki, Barbara Pearson, Polly Wally, Jockuler Juggler, Bruce Mitchell, Tom Lohrmann, and Duke & The Brier Patch Puppets.Liederplatz: Goschenhoppen Cornet Band, Frank DiBussolo Quartet, The Heartbeats, Flor de Cana, Bob Norman, Special Arrangement, Dan Dixon & Mellow Madness, David Roth, Elaine Silver, Lu Mitchell, Timlin & Kane, John Lionarons, Interweave, John Bressler, Vital Link, Rod MacDonald, Riverboat Banjo Band, Xavier Edouard Horemans, Marvin Falcon Ensemble, Janci Brothers, Stephanie Nakasian & Hod O'Brien, Bruce Mitchell, Thom Schuyler, Magpie, Richard Drueding & Tom Gala, Xavier Edouard Horemans with Mo Rolland, Mountain Laurel Bluegrass Band, Kim and Reggie Harris, Tom Yurasits, Municipal Opera Company of Allentown, One Alternative, Steve Brosky Band, Pete Fluck, D.J. & The C.B. Pickers, Daisy Jug Band, and Times Three.Main Street: Mike Surratt & The Continentals of Washington D.C, Harley Newman, The Memory Makers Orchestra, Jimmy Soldridge & The Happy Yanks, Juggernaut, The Naturals, Joe Weber Orchestra, Happy Polkateers, and Joe Furst Orchestra.Street Performers: The Silver & Brass Trombone Quartet, Harley Newmann, Al Grout, Captain Juggle, DayBreak, Mark Bodey, Clarence the Clown, Allegra, Fran Fallon, Jamie Watson, Pan's Fancy, Mark Reed & Sons, Joseph Keppel, Gene Galligan, Ray Owen, Jeff Umbehauer, Special Arrangement, Johnny Romann, Riverboat Banjo Band, The Original Hurdy-Gurdy Man, Mainstreet Brass Quintet, Barbara Martyska, Steve Whitaker, Fantasia-Ki, Tom Yurasits, Bruce Mitchell, Renwick Players Flute Ensemble, Tom Lohrman's Puppets, Jockuler Juggler, Four's Company, Polly Wally, and Duke & The Brier Patch Puppets.Volksplatz: The Horseflies, Musikverein Feuerwehrkapelle Huttenheim, Roger Latzgo, Old World Folk Band, Beltane, Shanachians, Flor de Cana, Saul Broudy & Friends, Beirut Band, Tom Espinola & Lorraine Duisit, David Amram Jazz Quartet, Walt Michael & Company, Juggernaut, Timlin & Kane, John Lionarons, Songs from the British Music Hall, Bill Miller, Roy Book Binder, Shady Grove Band, Robin and Linda Williams, Xavier Edouard Horemans, Dave Roper Trio, Hanover Township Society for the Preservation of the Big Band Sound in America, Moses Rascoe, Helicon, Seona McDowell, Mountain Laurel Bluegrass Band, Magpie, Pavlov's Dawgs, Queen Bee & The Blue Hornets, Laurie Lewis & Grant Street, Flamenco Ole, Critton Hollow, Reading Community Gospel Choir, Kazka Ukrainian Folk Ensemble, D J & The C B Pickers, and The Bruce Daigrepont Cajun Band.

1988 Performers

Kunstplatz Stage
 Bethlehem American Legion Band
 The Tannahill Weavers
 The Marvelettes
 The Four Freshmen
 Kevin Eubanks
 Queen Ida & The Bon Temps Zydeco Band
 Chuck Mangione
 Tito Puente
 Lehigh Valley Chamber Orchestra
 The Tommy Dorsey Orchestra
 The Mamas & the Papas
 Tom Chapin
 Rita Coolidge
 The Marshall Tucker Band
 Stadtkapelle Berching German Municipal Band
 Maureen McGovern

1987 Performers

Kunstplatz Stage
 Ray Charles
 The Spinners
 Air Force Band of the East
 Dizzy Gillespie
 Glenn Miller Orchestra
 The Musikfest Jazz All-Stars Band featuring Craig Kastelnik, Bobby "Lips" Levine, Alan Gaumer, Werner Lutz, Rob Stoneback, Alex Watkins, Pat Flaherty-Kastelnik, Paul Hubbell, Tom Kozik, Nelson Hill, Eddie Metz, Gary Rissmiller, Arnie Wetzel, Robert Routch, and Arlen Diefenderfer
 Joan Baez
 The Clancy Brothers
 The Lettermen
 Glad
 Musikverein Hussenhofen

1986 Performers

Kunstplatz Stage
 Judy Collins
 An Evening of Folk Music featuring Tom Paxton, Robin and Linda Williams, and Christine Lavin
 Arlo Guthrie
 Woody Herman and his Young Thundering Herd
 Carlos Montoya and the Lehigh Valley Chamber Orchestra
 Air Force Band of the East
 Lionel Hampton Orchestra
 The Turtles featuring Flo & Eddie
 Allentown Band

1985 Performers
Kunstplatz Stage
 The Association Blood, Sweat & Tears John Sebastian Pete Seeger Glenn Miller Orchestra Lehigh Valley Chamber Orchestra Pennsylvania Sinfonia Orchestra Allentown Band Koko Taylor Arvell Shaw and The Louis Armstrong Legacy Band'''

Liederplatz
Fresh Vegetables, Daniel Womack, Ray Owen, Johnny Brezovec, John Gorka, Heather and Royston Wood, Mock Turtle Marionette Theatre, Rainbow Collection, An Evening at a British Music Hall, Happy Boombadears, Mountain Laurel, Mike Dugan, Bob Carlin, Mike Craver, Dave Fry, Lu Mitchell, Four's Company, Hot House, Thompson Family Quintet, Fairmount Brass Quartet, Kato, John Bauer, Broadway's Greatest Songs in Concert, Mail Pouch Express, Nashville Bluegrass Band, Kim and Reggie Harris, Peter Tork, Swing Shift, Ilona's Strolling Violins, Chorus of the Lehigh Valley, Darlene Rose and 1,001 Hawaiians, John Gorka, Roland Kushner, Lord Burgess, Happy Boombadears, Beethoven Choruses of Bethlehem, Fess Roundtree, Cranberry Lake Jug Band, Alan Gaumer Quartet, Kevin Roth, Steve Brosky, Alan Gaumer Quartet, Cornerstone, Lord Burgess, Garnet Rogers, Hanover Township Society for the Preservation of Big Band Sound in America, Harley the Clown's Washtub Circus, Diamond State Saxophone Quartet, Satin 'n' Lace, The Writer's Group: Thom Schuyler, Chris Rawlings and Gilles Losier, Ilona's Strolling Violins, Mario Acerra's Show Biz Revue, Touchstone's Theatre – "Comic Book Kid", The Writer's Group: Fred Knobloch, Steve Whitaker, Sweet Adelines, Sadie Green Sales, Johnny Brezovec, Alan Gaumer Quartet, Shanachians, Lew London, Meixner Kinder, and Pennsylvania Playhouse: "Joseph and the Amazing Technicolor Dreamcoat".

1984 Performers
1984 marked the first year for the annual festival. There were far fewer acts then there are currently, and the size of the festival was much smaller than it is right now. 182,000 people attended the very first festival, and since then that number has greatly increased.

Kunstplatz Stage
 Don McLean
 The Louis Armstrong All-Stars featuring Arvell Shaw, Marty Napoleon, Doc Cheatham, Norris Turney, Percy Brice, and Benny Powell
 The Rob Stoneback Big Band
 Park Frankenfield & The Dixieland All-Stars
 Lehigh Valley Chamber Orchestra
 A Performance by The Beethoven Male Chorus and The Beethoven Ladies Choir
 Allentown Symphony Orchestra
 The Polish-American String Band of Philadelphia
 Johnson Mountain Boys and Skyline
 Stadkappelle Berching
 The American Legion Band of Bethlehem
 Allentown Band

Other performers included John Gorka, Mary Faith Rhodes, John Pearse, Claudia Schmidt, Touchstone, Howard and Frank Swope, Jim Davis, Keith and Karlene Brintzenhoff, Mock Turtle Marionette Theater Workshop, Madeline MacNeil, Seth Austen, Clem Bowen, Kathy Pierce, Mike Dugan, Dave Fry, Johnny Rommann, Sharon Ettinger, Mike Krusukas, Mark Golin, Roger Latzgo, The Thompson Family Quintet, Happy Boombadears, Hanover Township Society for the Preservation of Big Band Sound in America, Leroy Heffentrager German Band, The Happy Yanks, The Bavarian Ambassadors, John Brezovec, Beirut Band, Wild Rose, Touma, and The Bethlehem A Cappella Singers.

References

External links

 
 ArtsQuest, Musikfest's parent organization

1984 establishments in Pennsylvania
Annual events in Pennsylvania
August events
Bethlehem, Pennsylvania
Music festivals established in 1984
Music festivals in Pennsylvania
Recurring events established in 1984
Tourist attractions in Lehigh County, Pennsylvania
Tourist attractions in Northampton County, Pennsylvania